Billy Bainbridge (born 9 September 1997) is an Australian professional rugby league footballer who plays as a  and  for the Manly Warringah Sea Eagles in the National Rugby League.

Background
Bainbridge was born in Cromer, New South Wales, Australia.

He played his junior rugby league for the Manly Christian Brothers, before being signed by the Manly Warringah Sea Eagles.

Playing career

2015
In 2015 and 2016, Bainbridge played for the Manly Warringah Sea Eagles' NYC team. In August 2015, he re-signed with the Sea Eagles on a 2-year contract until the end of 2017.

2016
In round 26 of the 2016 NRL season, Bainbridge made his NRL debut for the Sea Eagles against the Penrith Panthers.

References

External links

Manly Warringah Sea Eagles profile

1997 births
Living people
Australian rugby league players
Manly Warringah Sea Eagles players
Rugby league second-rows
Rugby league locks
Rugby league players from Sydney